Alexander Ames Wihtol [Sandy] (born  June 1, 1955) is an American former professional baseball player. A right-handed pitcher, he worked in 28 games — all in relief — over parts of three seasons (1979–1980; 1982) for the Cleveland Indians of Major League Baseball.

Wihtol's professional career lasted for nine seasons (1975–1983), all in the Cleveland organization. He attended Homestead High School (Cupertino, California), and De Anza College, also in Cupertino, and was selected by the Indians in the second round of the secondary phase of the June 1974 amateur draft.

After a strong  season as a relief pitcher with the Triple-A Tacoma Tigers, Wihtol made his Cleveland and MLB debut that September when rosters expanded to 40 men. Although treated roughly in his first two outings, Wihtol was unscored upon in his last three appearances to post a creditable 3.38 earned run average, with ten hits allowed in 10 innings pitched. In , Wihtol split the year between Tacoma and Cleveland; he worked in 17 games for the Indians from July through September and notched his only Major League win (on July 25 against the California Angels) and save (on September 30 against the New York Yankees).

In 28 career Major League games, Wihtol allowed 54 hits and 24 bases on balls in 57 innings pitched, with 34 strikeouts. Since retiring from the game in 1984, Wihtol has been a full-time Realtor working and living on the San Francisco Peninsula and has stayed involved with the game by serving as head baseball coach of Los Altos High School.

References

External links
 
Retrosheet
Venezuelan Professional Baseball League

1955 births
Living people
Baseball players from California
Charleston Charlies players
Chattanooga Lookouts players
Cleveland Indians players
De Anza Dons baseball players
Gulf Coast Indians players
Jersey City Indians players
Leones del Caracas players
American expatriate baseball players in Venezuela
Major League Baseball pitchers
People from Cupertino, California
Sportspeople from Palo Alto, California
Portland Beavers players
San Jose Bees players
Tacoma Tigers players
Tacoma Tugs players
Waterloo Indians players
Alaska Goldpanners of Fairbanks players